BEGBORROWSTEEL is an LP by American hip hop artist and multi-instrumentalist Count Bass D, his third LP. It was released on August 21, 2005 on Jazzy Sport.

The LP was first released in Japan on Octave, on February 21, 2004. The Japan release includes four exclusive bonus tracks. It was released in Germany on RAMP Recordings the same year as a two-vinyl packaging, one containing the original album and the second containing the instrumentals of each song. The album released again in Germany with three new tracks added, and "Like a Pimp" omitted.

Track listing

References

2005 albums